Flyer II may refer to:

Flyer II (yacht), the yacht with which the Dutch skipper Conny van Rietschoten won the 1981–82 Whitbread Round the World Race, which was his second win in the race
Ravine Flyer II, a hybrid wooden roller coaster located at Waldameer Park in Erie, Pennsylvania, United States
Wright Flyer II, the second powered aircraft built by Wilbur and Orville Wright in 1904